This is a list of football clubs that compete within the leagues and divisions of the Iraqi football league system during the 2021–22 season.

List of Leagues and Divisions
Premier League (level 1)
Division One (level 2)
Division Two (level 3)
Division Three (level 4)
Division Four (level 5)

Alphabetical list



A

B

D

E

G

H

I

J

K

M

N

P

Q

R

S

T

U

W

Z

See also
 List of football clubs in Iraq by major honours won

External links
 Iraqi Football Website

Iraq
 
Football clubs
Football clubs